Harry Cherrington Brook (born 22 February 1999) is an English international cricketer who plays international cricket for England and domestic cricket for Yorkshire County Cricket Club. Primarily a right-handed batsman, he also bowls right-arm medium pace. He made his international debut for England in January 2022. He has made an extraordinary start to his test career by amassing 809 runs in his first six test appearances having batted ten times with a career average of 80.90 and with strike rate of almost 100.

Early life
Brook was born in Keighley but raised in Burley in Wharfedale. His family were active in club cricket.

He was educated at Ilkley Grammar School, a comprehensive school in Ilkley, West Yorkshire. At the age of 14, he left having been offered a scholarship at Sedbergh School, a private boarding school in Cumbria. Journalist Alex Mason reported for the Cricketer Magazine that former professional cricketer and Sedbergh School cricket coach Martin Speight was a very big influence on Brook's career during his schooldays.

Cricket career

Domestic
Brook made his first-class debut for Yorkshire against Pakistan A on 26 June 2016 at Headingley whilst still at school. He made his County Championship debut for Yorkshire against Middlesex at Lord's on 19 June 2017. His debut followed a series of three centuries scored within a fortnight for Yorkshire's second eleven. At international level, Brook toured India in early 2017 with the England under-19s, playing in two U-19 Tests and five U-19 LOIs against the India under-19s.

Brook made his Twenty20 debut for Yorkshire in the 2018 t20 Blast on 5 July 2018. He was signed by Northern Superchargers for The Hundred 2021 tournament.

In 2022, Brook was signed by Lahore Qalandars. In match against Islamabad United, Brook came to bat when Lahore was 12-3 and scored an unbeaten 102 off 49 balls as his team made a 197 total. It was his maiden T20 century, becoming the youngest ever centurion in the Pakistan Super League.

In April 2022, Brook was bought by the Northern Superchargers for the 2022 season of The Hundred.

In South Africa's new SA20 competition, Brook will play for the Johannesburg Super Kings (JSK), who paid R2.3 million for his services.

In IPL 2023, Brook will play for the Sunrisers Hyderabad, who paid Rs. 13.25 crore($1.6 million).

International
Brook captained the England under-19 cricket team in a five match youth ODI series against India in August 2017.

In December 2017, Brook was named as the captain of England's squad for the 2018 Under-19 Cricket World Cup. In England's second group fixture, against Bangladesh, he scored 102 not out, becoming the second England captain after Alastair Cook to score a century in the U19 World Cup. Following England's matches in the tournament, the International Cricket Council (ICC) named Brook as the rising star of the squad. He was the leading run-scorer for England in the tournament, with 239 runs.

In January 2022, Brook was named in the England's T20I squad for the series against West Indies. He made his T20I debut on 26 January 2022, for England against the West Indies. In May 2022, Brook was named in England's Test squad for their home series against New Zealand. In July 2022, Brook was named in England's One Day International (ODI) squad for their home series against India. In August 2022, he was named in England's Test squad for their series against South Africa. He made his Test debut on 8 September 2022, for England against South Africa. In September 2022, Brook was named in England's squad for the 2022 Men's T20 world cup who then went on to win the tournament.

He was included in the Test and T20I squads of the English cricket team in Pakistan in 2022–23. During the first Test in Rawalpindi, he top scored in both innings, notching up his first Test century of 153 runs in the first innings and 87 in the second, helping to set up England for their win on the final day. He made his ODI debut on 27 January 2023, for England against South Africa.

In February 2023, during the second and final test match against New Zealand at Basin Reserve, he became the first batsman to reach 800 test runs in just nine innings and his tally of 800 runs came off after facing just 803 deliveries in his test career. In test matches, only Sunil Gavaskar (912 runs) and Sir Donald Bradman (862 runs) made more runs in their first six appearances.

He registered his career best test score of 186 which came off just 174 deliveries including 24 fours and 5 sixes during the test match with a strike rate of 105.68 where he alongside Joe Root rescued England by lifting England from a precarious position of 21/3 to a total of 435/8 before the declaration. He and Root added crucial 302 runs for the fourth wicket before the former being undone by Matt Henry. Following his dismissal, he made history by being the leading run-scorer in test cricket after their first nine test innings with tally of 809 runs surpassing the previous record held by Vinod Kambli of India who had made 792 runs in 9 innings. His partnership with Root also broke the record for the highest ever partnership by an English pair against New Zealand in New Zealand for any wicket as the previous record was held by Andrew Flintoff and Graham Thorpe who had combined for a 282 run partnership. Brook completed his fourth test century in just six test appearances and his career average rose to above 100.

References

External links
 

1999 births
English cricketers
England Twenty20 International cricketers
England Test cricketers
Living people
Cricketers from Keighley
Yorkshire cricketers
People educated at Ilkley Grammar School
People educated at Sedbergh School
English cricketers of the 21st century
Northern Superchargers cricketers
Hobart Hurricanes cricketers